NMN may refer to:

 National Monuments Council
 Nicotinamide mononucleotide
 Nigerian Merchant Navy
 "No middle name", sometimes used in legal documents for people with no middle name
 NMN, the National Rail station code for New Mills Newtown railway station, Derbyshire, England
 nmn, the ISO 639 code for the Taa language